BDN or Bdn may refer to:

Baldemu language, spoken in northern Cameroon (ISO 639-3 code: bdn)
Bangor Daily News
Bend Municipal Airport, Oregon, United States (IATA airport code: BDN)
Benefit dependency network
Black Disciples, a street gang in Chicago, United States
Blue Dot Network
Brading railway station, Isle of Wight, United Kingdom (National Rail code: BDN)
BDN, sister station of BKN
Big Dick Nick, nickname for NFL Quarterback Nick Foles